Staff Sergeant Ambrosio Guillen (December 7, 1929 – July 25, 1953) was a United States Marine who was posthumously awarded the Medal of Honor—the United States' highest military award for valor—for his heroic actions and sacrifice of life on July 25, 1953, two days before the ceasefire, during the Korean War. He was responsible for his infantry platoon's turning an overwhelming enemy attack into a defeat and disorderly retreat.

Early years
Ambrosio Guillen was born on December 7, 1929, in La Junta, Colorado. He came from a Mexican-American family and grew up in El Paso, Texas, where he attended Bowie High School.

Guillen enlisted in the United States Marine Corps at the age of 18. He completed recruit training at San Diego, California, and was assigned to the 7th Marine Regiment. Following his tour of sea duty, he was appointed a drill instructor at the Marine Corps Recruit Depot, San Diego.

He trained two recruit honor platoons and was given a Letter of Appreciation by his Commanding General. In that letter, MajGen John T. Walker stated, "your success in training these two platoons has demonstrated your outstanding ability as a leader." That ability was proven in combat soon after SSgt. Guillen arrived in Korea.

Korean War
On July 25, 1953, while defending a forward outpost against a large enemy attack, near Songuch-on, Korea, SSgt. Guillen and his platoon were able to defeat the enemy and put them in retreat. After the fighting, he died from being wounded during the battle. For his heroic leadership and sacrifice of life, he was awarded the Medal of Honor. The Medal or Honor awarded to SSgt. Guillen was presented to his parents on his behalf by the Secretary of the Navy Charles S. Thomas, during a special ceremony in his office on August 18, 1954.

Medal of Honor
SSgt. Guillen's Medal of Honor citation reads:

Burial
After the Korean War truce, his body was escorted to the United States by his brother, who had been serving in the Far East with the United States Army. SSgt. Guillen was buried in Fort Bliss National Cemetery on October 20, 1953, in El Paso, Texas.

Public namings
 The Ambrosio Guillen Texas State Veterans Home in El Paso is named in his honor.
 Guillen Middle School in the El Paso Independent School District.

See also

List of Medal of Honor recipients
List of Korean War Medal of Honor recipients
List of Hispanic Medal of Honor recipients
Hispanics in the United States Marine Corps

References

External links
Ambrosio Guillen Texas State Veterans Home

1929 births
1953 deaths
United States Marine Corps Medal of Honor recipients
People from El Paso, Texas
United States Marine Corps non-commissioned officers
American military personnel killed in the Korean War
Korean War recipients of the Medal of Honor
People from La Junta, Colorado
United States Marine Corps personnel of the Korean War